Patton Park is a  park located on the southwest side of Detroit, Michigan. The park, named for the World War II US military leader General George S. Patton, was dedicated in the early 1950s. Local landowner Jacques Baby bequeathed the  tract of land to the City of Detroit for a park. The park retains a restrictive covenant that prohibits the City from tampering with the park, lest the park returns to Baby's descendants. (Restrictive covenants in City of Detroit parks have also been placed into the deeds at Eliza Howell Park and Rackham Golf Course.)

Location and Patton Pond
Sitting within Patton Park is a Detroit Recreation Department recreation center, also bearing Patton’s name. The Patton Park Recreation Center once boasted America’s first indoor-outdoor swimming pool, due to its one time hangar-like doors that completely opened two exterior walls, allowing swimmers to use a raised outdoor patio that overlooked three sets of tennis courts, a racquetball court and a swimming/fishing pond.

Patton Park is also home to a sizable pond-marsh area, located directly southwest of the recreation center. The pond was a favorite swimming hole and fishing spot until the mid-1970s. The Patton Recreation Center once had a basement-level (step-down stairway) entrance to locker rooms to accommodate park-goers who utilized the pond area. The recreation center also had a rowing boat that once serviced the pond.

The Patton Pond was a natural outgrowth of the nearby springs, emanating from the area of Lonyo and Dix Streets. (The surrounding area was once named Springwells Township, after the preponderance of natural springs in the area.) Up until the early 1960s, the water flowed unabated as Baby (or Baubee) Creek  through Patton Park, beneath Vernor, and along Woodmere Cemetery (Riverside Drive) in Dearborn. Baby Creek, was named after its first landowner, Jacques Baby. Baby Creek flowed into the Woodmere Cemetery pond, before flowing out near the intersection of Riverside and Dearborn Avenues, out into the Rouge River, on Miller Road (north of Fort Street). Baby Creek was impounded beneath Patton Park through a set of parallel tunnels in the early 1960s, as well as through Woodmere Cemetery.

Opening and 1967 riots
The grand opening of the Patton Park Recreation Center was a spectacular affair, eight years after America’s victory in World War II. The grand opening was attended by Queen Juliana of the Netherlands, as a gesture of the Netherlands' thanks. In addition to America’s first indoor-outdoor swimming pool, the City of Detroit Recreation Department spared no expense in making, at the time,  Patton Park a world-class recreational facility. This was not surprising, as Detroit was nationally known in its golden years as having one of the nation’s premier recreational departments.

Patton Park gained attention during the 1967 race riots, when a landing strip was hastily constructed to bring in National Guard supplies. A National Guard camp was also established at Patton Park, although no strife occurred in or around the surrounding area.

Festivities, fireworks and facilities
The park was a focal point for Southwest Detroit celebrations throughout the seasons. The greatest of such was the post-festivities from the annual Southwest Detroit Fourth of July Parade, from Beard St. to Woodmere Ave., along a one-mile stretch of Vernor Hwy. The day always contained numerous family barbecues, games and swimming at the park’s recreation center, culminating with a fireworks show above the Patton Park Pond. The fireworks display straddled the Dearborn–Detroit border across Patton Park. A story has it that calls came in from Dearborn officials, concerned about fireworks in their city (a portion of Patton Park crosses into Dearborn, along Baby Creek); reassurances by Patton Park staffers that the fireworks were “on the Detroit side”, satisfied the Dearborn officials.

Patton Park once contained two separate tennis court areas, three softball diamonds (including a lighted diamond), and one hardball diamond. The park also contained a permanent satellite restroom (located near the lighted softball diamond), four drinking fountains throughout the park, a stocked fishing pond, a small amphitheater, and two separate picnic areas.

The recreation center, built and dedicated at the same time the park was inaugurated, once boasted an indoor stage-theater, located at the back of the gymnasium. The second floor of the two story structure had a large community room where dances and social events were held. In the 1980s, until the Patton Recreation Center was renovated, the area housed a weight room. Another large room on the second level contained a hardwood floor, which was used for dances, dance instruction and community meetings. A small kitchen was located in a side room in this area. Two sets of seating areas were also located on the second level of the Patton Recreation Center, one for the gymnasium, and the other for the swimming pool.

Renovation
The Patton Recreation Center underwent major renovation in 1978 that shut the recreation center for two years. During that time, the original gym floor was replaced, the stage-theater was demolished and sealed off, and the locker rooms were partially renovated. The recreation center underwent another renovation in 2002 that saw the closure of the recreation center for three years. The most recent renovation was a $10 million effort, paid for through Detroit’s Water & Sewerage Department (D.W.S.D.), through an agreement with Detroit’s Recreation Department, who agreed to give up a portion of Patton Park to D.W.S.D. for the construction of a combined sewer overflow retention facility, attached directly to the D.W.S.D.’s existing Woodmere Pumping Station, also located within Patton Park.

Changes
The surrounding Patton Park neighborhood has changed and adjusted to the economic climate that has roiled the city of Detroit over the past five decades. Particularly hard hit with the closure of General Motors' Cadillac Headquarters and Fleetwood and Fisher Guide assembly plants, the Patton Park neighborhood area experienced hardships from the early 1980s. This was most visibly pronounced in the greater Vernor-Springwells business district, where long-standing southwest Detroit institutions closed. Businesses such as Neisners, Jupiters, Paradise Candies, Rebert’s Bakery, Chimes Restaurant, Sheridan’s Sports, Vanity Fair, and Todt’s Pharmacy all folded due to the demise of General Motors’ local assembly plants. The ensuing exodus of long-time homeowners who had worked at the auto plants, along with a particularly hard-hitting recession in 1980–82 and the opening of nearby Fairlane Mall, all made shopping in the Vernor-Springwells area unnecessary.

In 2006, an effort was undertaken to create a paved, asphalt trail along the Dix Road side of Patton Park. The effort was years in the planning, and cost $9 million. The trail starts at the corner of Norman and Woodmere Streets (nearest the northern point of Patton Park and heads south along Dix Road to the park’s end at Dale St. The trail ends at Vernor Highway, nearest Riverside Drive (along Woodmere Cemetery). It has been further improved with three decorative park benches, garbage containers and numerous tree plantings throughout. Additional tree plantings have since been carried out along the trail by the Greening of Detroit conservancy group. A similar campaign was used for nearby Lapeer Park in Dearborn, complete with an extended trail, directional signs and landscaping.  This trail has become an anchor for the Southwest Detroit Greenways Link, a series of bicycle paths/dedicated roadway lanes from Lapeer Park, Patton Park, through Vernor Highway, connecting to other networks of bike lanes in Detroit's Mexicantown and Corktown neighborhoods.

References

 Patton Community Center City of Detroit

Parks in Detroit
George S. Patton